Adriano Morais (born 21 February 1948) is a Portuguese wrestler. He competed in the men's Greco-Roman 63 kg at the 1968 Summer Olympics.

References

External links
 

1948 births
Living people
Portuguese male sport wrestlers
Olympic wrestlers of Portugal
Wrestlers at the 1968 Summer Olympics
People from Torres Vedras
Sportspeople from Lisbon District